Stemware is drinkware that stands on stems above a base.  It is usually made from glass, but may be made from ceramics or metals. The stem allows the drinker to hold the glass without affecting the temperature of the drink.

Stemware includes:
 Absinthe glasses
 Champagne flutes
 Chalices and goblets
 Cocktail glasses (including martini glasses and margarita glasses)
 Liqueur glasses
 Rummers
 Snifters
 Wine glasses

References

External links

Drinking glasses
Drinkware